Ablassé Ouédrago (born 30 June 1953 in Dabaré) is a Burkinabé economist, diplomat and politician.

From March 1994 to February 1999, Ouédraogo served as Minister of Foreign Affairs for Burkina Faso. From February to November 1999, he served as Special Advisor to the President of Burkina Faso, Blaise Compaoré. In those positions, he helped influence the country's foreign policy. He is the founder and current president of the Faso Autrement party. In December 2012, Ouédrago was elected to the Burkina Faso National Party.

Early years and education

Ouédraogo was born on 30 June 1953 in Dabaré, Pabré Department, in the province of Kadiogo in Burkina Faso. Drawing on an impressive career in development, diplomacy and politics, he is the current President of the Faso Autrement (Faso Reimagined) Party, and was a candidate in the 2015 Burkinabé general election that took place on 29 November 2015, which he only got 1.93% of all the votes, losing to Roch Marc Christian Kaboré. Ouédrago is the founder of the liberal centrist Faso Autrement or Alternative Faso Party, which obtained its receipt of legal existence on 12 September 2011. Its motto is: “Nothing stops an idea whose time has come.”

The son of a farmer, Ouédrago is a member of the Mossi ethnic group and is Muslim. He attended the Cercle de Boussé public primary school before completing his secondary education at the Lycée Philippe Zinda Kaboré in Ouagadougou. Holder of a Baccalaureate in economics, Ouédrago received a scholarship from the Association of African Universities to study economics at the National University of Gabon, in Libreville, from 1973 to 1975. Upon obtaining his degree, he enrolled in the University of Nice in France to pursue further study in economics from 1975 to 1981. He would go on to defend his doctorate in economic sciences with a specialization in development economics, for which he earned high honors and special jury commendation on 15 December 1981. His dissertation examined “Multinational firms and the industrialization of developing countries.” Returning home in January 1982, Ouédrago taught economics at the Ecole Supérieure des Sciences Economiques (ESSEC, known today as UFR-SEG) of University of Ouagadougou from January to July 1982, before embarking on a career in the international arena.

Political career

Participation in government

Ouédrago served first as Minister of Foreign Affairs for Burkina Faso from March 1994 to February 1999, then as Special Advisor to the President of Burkina Faso from February to November 1999. From these positions, he orchestrated the strategic reorientation of the country's foreign policy through the development and implementation of the concept of “development diplomacy.” This approach, on the one hand, enabled the channeling of greater resources toward development and stimulation of the local economy, and, on the other, helped raise the country's profile as a safe haven, solidifying Burkina Faso's place in the community of nations at global, continental and sub-regional levels. This allowed Burkina Faso to gain, among other notable achievements, the Presidency of the Organization of African Unity for the first time in 1998 – 1999. The country also has hosted numerous Marquee International Events, such as the [Summit of Heads of State and Government of Africa and France in December 1996, the Africa Cup of Nations in February 1998, and the AU Summit of Heads of State and Government in July 1998, as well as other large ministerial conferences of various sectors.

Ouédrago also has been a major player in peace and development efforts throughout Africa, notably contributing to the resolution of the Tuareg rebellion in Niger and Mali, and helping to bring an end to conflicts in Liberia, Guinea-Bissau, Sierra Leone and Burundi, as well as between Ethiopia and Eritrea during a particularly turbulent period.

Entry into the Burkinabé political opposition
 
Taking note of the excesses of the regime of President Blaise Compaoré, and wishing to make a positive contribution, Ouédrago decided to make his official entry into politics by joining the ranks of the opposition. He founded his own party, Faso Autrement (Faso Reimagined), with a liberal centrist ideology in June 2011.
In doing so, Ouédrago envisaged the political, economic, and social transformation of a Burkina Faso united and reimagined, one that would strive for socio-economic progress for all in a stable and secure environment. At the core of this strategy was the development of human capital for inclusive growth and sustainable development for all Burkinabé, with a more just and equitable distribution of the fruits of growth and development.

In December 2012, Ouédrago was elected for the first time as a member of the Parliament to the Burkina Faso National Assembly in the Fifth Legislature of the Fourth Republic, representing for that half-term his newly created party. In this capacity, he helped to improve operations of the legislature and to strengthen policy debate among Parliamentarians, through the interventions of the Burkinabé political opposition.

Ouédrago also played a significant and decisive role in combating the modification to Article 37 of the Burkinabé Constitution governing presidential term limits. He served as national coordinator of the political opposition protests in Ouagadougou, including the last and most memorable protest of Tuesday 28 October 2014.

Popular insurrection of 30–31 October 2014

Ouédrago was front and center in the management of the political crisis of 30–31 October 2014, which brought an end to the 27-year regime of President Blaise Compaoré. Overnight, the country entered a 12-month period of transition, with the goal of organizing fair, free, and transparent legislative and presidential elections on 11 October 2015, in response to the call of the Burkinabé people for turnover and change.
His key role in the management of the crisis and in the implementation of the political transition demonstrated his capacities as leader and steward of the nation's interests in preserving social peace, stability and security.

Ouédrago was noted for facilitating and participating in the drafting of the Transition Charter. He led essential consultations and mediations with major stakeholders in the crisis, and engaged with facilitators from the international community. This allowed for the restoration, in the brief span of 15 days, of Constitutional order and stability in the country. In addition to serving as Co-Rapporteur of the Drafting Commission of the Transition Charter, Ouédrago was a member of the College for Appointing the President of the Transition.

In June 2015, Ouédrago was tapped by Faso Autrement to take his social project forward into the presidential race, and to lead his team to the conquest of the National Assembly.

In September 2015, Ouédrago once again demonstrated his considerable mediation and conflict management skills by contributing to the successful effort to preserve peace and stability in Burkina Faso following the failed coup d’état on 17 September 2015, staged by the former Regiment of Presidential Security (ex-RSP). A man of unity, reconciliation, tolerance and forgiveness, he strove to defuse tensions, thereby helping to avoid confrontation among the military factions and avert chaos.

International career

In the international arena, Ouédrago has served in various high-level functions in which, once again, he has been called upon to manage crises and quell conflicts, all while working for the furtherance of development and for the maintenance of peace and security.
From 1982 to 1994, Ouédrago worked for the United Nations Development Programme (UNDP), where he served, successively, as Deputy Administrator for the United Nations Organization for Industrial Development in Niamey, Niger, from 1982 to 1984; Head of Programme in Conakry, Guinea, from 1984 to 1986; Deputy Resident Representative to the Organization of African Unity (OAU) and the Economic Commission for Africa (ECA) in Addis Ababa, Ethiopia, from 1986 to 1988; Resident Representative a.i. in Brazzaville, Congo, from 1988 to 1991; Deputy Resident Representative in Kinshasa, Zaire (now Democratic Republic of Congo) and Regional Director for East Africa of the United Nations Office for the Sudan-Sahel Region (UNSO) in Nairobi, Kenya.
During this period, Ouédrago contributed to the implementation of several multi-sectorial development programs, in addition to participating in the negotiation process that led to the independence of Namibia and in the mediation for the restoration of peace and stability in Zaire in the early 1990s.

From 1999 to 2002, Ouédrago was the first African to serve as Deputy Director-General of the World Trade Organization (WTO). During his term, he successfully ushered Africa to the WTO and the WTO to Africa. In November 2000, he organized the first-ever conference for African Ministers of Trade in Libreville, Gabon, under the auspices of the WTO. He also has presented at various major forums on matters of development and trade during the WTO Ministerial Conferences in Seattle in November 1999 and Doha in November 2001, and at the International Conference on Financing for Development held at Monterrey in March 2002.

From December 2003 to July 2007, Ouédrago served as Senior Adviser for Africa to the President of the African Development Bank Group (ADB). In this capacity, he represented the ADB Group among the peace negotiators in Darfur, assuming the role of President of the Wealth Sharing Commission. The negotiations resulted in the signing of the Darfur Peace Agreement on 5 May 2006 in Abuja, Nigeria.

From August 2007 to June 2008, Ouédrago was Special Adviser to the President of the Commission of the Economic Community of West African States (ECOWAS) for trade negotiations. In this role, he contributed to negotiations on the Economic Partnership Agreements between the European Union and ECOWAS, and also advocated on behalf of cotton-producing countries during multilateral negotiations at the WTO.

Between 2008 and 2009, Ouédrago participated in several interventions on behalf of the President of the African Union Commission in the negotiations between Chad and Sudan, which helped renew social and diplomatic relations between the two countries.
From February to December 2009, Ouédrago was Special Envoy of the President of the African Union Commission to Madagascar. At his urging, the key players in the Malagasy crisis signed, on 6 November 2009 at the African Union Commission's Addis Ababa headquarters, the Additional Act of Addis Ababa to the Malagasy Charter of the Transition, which had been signed on 9 August 2009, in Maputo, Mozambique. This Additional Act settled the matter of the sharing of power.

Private sector, education, and research engagements

Ouédrago is an active consultant on international matters, road safety and the recreation industry. He is the General Administrator of ZOODO International, an international and strategic relations consulting firm that he created in 2008.

He lent his expertise on cultural diversity to the International Organization of the Francophonie (OIF) in the preparation and adoption of the UNESCO International Convention on Cultural Diversity in 2003.

A great lover and defender of culture, Ouédrago has been active in promoting the musical arts, organizing a Burkinabé Music Summit in September 2011. He also has collaborated with musicians in composing musical works, including most recently the Party anthem, “Faso Autrement.”

His involvement in education, training and research is evident in his university-level teaching, notably in his participation in the Administrative Council of the International Centre for Tropical agriculture (CIAT) from July 2007 to August 2008. In this context, he has promoted agricultural research in Africa. Additionally, from September 2010 to June 2013, he served as President of the Administrative Council for the New Inter-University Third Cycle in Economics for universities in Central and West Africa. 
Advancing the development of rural communities

Ouédrago has worked tirelessly to promote the self-determination of rural populations, with a focus on expanding village access to water, solar energy, and health services. Appreciating first-hand the values of education and work, he has encouraged and promoted access to public and religious schools for rural communities, prioritizing youth access to culture. Ouédrago believes that each young person, through education and work, can create his or her own future and contribute to the country's development.

A fervent supporter of the rights of women, Ouédrago has worked to promote women empowerment in rural and urban communities. In rural communities, he has supported revenue-generating activities for women that link agricultural production to solar energy. Throughout his management and leadership processes, he always makes sure to directly engage women and youth on his team.

Distinctions
Officer of the National Order of Burkina Faso, December 1997
Officer of the National Equatorial Order of Gabon, November 2000

References

Burkinabé economists
Living people
1953 births
Foreign ministers of Burkina Faso
Government ministers of Burkina Faso
World Trade Organization people
Burkinabé Muslims
United Nations Development Programme officials
Burkinabé diplomats
Burkinabé officials of the United Nations
21st-century Burkinabé people